The Guardia alla Frontiera (GaF) (transl. Border Guard), was an Regio Esercito Border guard created in 1937 who defended the 1,851 km of northern Italian frontiers with the so-called "Vallo Alpino Occidentale" (487 km with France), "Vallo Alpino Settentrionale" (724 km with Switzerland and 420 km with Austria) and "Vallo Alpino Orientale" (220 km with Yugoslavia).

In 1940 the GaF had 21,000 military personnel, deployed in eight commands, 27 sectors and seven regiments of artillery. It manned 1,000 fortifications, 6,000 machine guns, 1,000 mortars, 100 Cannone da 47/32 M35 , and another thousand other medium and small-caliber cannons (75/27 and 149/35).

By 10 June 1940 (Italy's entry into the war) the GaF (not counting colonies in Libya  and Albania) contained 23 sectors, 50,000 men, 28 battalions "Vallo Alpino", and 22 battalions of fascist militia.

Organization 

Each command of the army of GaF could be divided into "sectors" (27 areas of coverage, from I to XXVII, along the border; sectors XVIII, XIX and XX were never realized), which could break down in subsectors and so on for ever smaller units. Each command in the field had two or more subsectors which controlled the fortifications. These works were manned by infantry, artillery, engineers, etc. Despite the GaF being predominantly static it also received five light tank (carristi) companies, equipped with Fiat 3000 tanks that over time, due to their age and lack of spare parts, ended largely abandoned in  Sector armories or buried to use the turrets as a fort.

The Guardia alla Frontiera disappeared after 1943, but nominally was active until 1953.

In Italy

Vallo alpino occidentale 

Three artillery regiments supported the sectors of the Vallo alpino occidentale:
 7th Guardia alla Frontiera Artillery Regiment, in Cuneo
 8th Guardia alla Frontiera Artillery Regiment, in Venaria Reale
 11th Guardia alla Frontiera Artillery Regiment, in Savona

Vallo alpino settentrionale 

One artillery regiment and one autonomous artillery group supported the sectors of the Vallo alpino settentrionale:
 6th Guardia alla Frontiera Artillery Regiment, in Bolzano
 Guardia alla Frontiera Autonomous Artillery Group, in Sondrio

Vallo alpino orientale 

Three artillery regiments supported the sectors of the Vallo alpino orientale:
 9th Guardia alla Frontiera Artillery Regiment, in Gorizia
 10th Guardia alla Frontiera Artillery Regiment, in Trieste
 12th Guardia alla Frontiera Artillery Regiment, in Osoppo

In Albania 

One artillery regiment supported the 26th Command in Albania:
 13th Guardia alla Frontiera Artillery Regiment, in Tirana

In Libya

Libyan-Tunisian border 

One artillery regiment supported the units arrayed on the Libyan-Tunisian border:
 14th Guardia alla Frontiera Artillery Regiment, in Tripoli

Libyan-Egyptian border

Libyan Sahara

Notes

See also
 Alpine Wall

Italian Army
Military of Italy
1937 establishments in Italy
1953 disestablishments in Italy
Military units and formations of Italy
Military units and formations established in 1937
Military units and formations disestablished in 1953